Rampur district is one of the districts of Uttar Pradesh state of India, and Rampur town is the district headquarters. Rampur district is a part of Moradabad division.

Demographics

According to the 2011 Census of India, Rampur district has a population of 2,335,819, roughly equal to the nation of Latvia or the US state of New Mexico. This gives it a ranking of 194th in India (out of a total of 640). Its population growth rate over the decade 2001-2011 was 21.4%. Rampur has a sex ratio of 905 females for every 1000 males, and a literacy rate of 75.08%. Scheduled Castes make up 13.18% of the population.

Islam is the majority religion in the district. Three out of five tehsils in Rampur have a Muslim majority and one a Muslim plurality. Hindus are majority in rural areas, while Muslims predominate in urban areas. Sikhs are a significant minority in Bilaspur and Suar tehsils.

At the time of the 2011 Census of India, 73.85% of the population of the district spoke Hindi, 23.04% Urdu and 2.54% Punjabi as their first language.

Notable people
 Ali Yusuf Ali, Indian politician
 Muhammad Kazim Ali Khan, Indian politician 
 Azam Khan, Indian politician 
 Mohammad Ali, Pakistani Actor 
 Mohammad Ali Jauhar 
 Maulana Shaukhat Ali, Politician 
Sahabzada Yaqub Khan
Raza Murad
Murad (actor)
Rukhsar Rehman
Athar Shah Khan Jaidi
Javed Siddiqui
Zohra Sehgal
Uzra Butt

See also 
 Other places with name Rampur

References

 
Districts of Uttar Pradesh
Minority Concentrated Districts in India